Gerald Barney may refer to:

 Gerry Barney, British graphic designer, best known for designing the British Rail Double Arrow
 Gerald O. Barney, American physicist and expert in the field of sustainable development